Birgitte Krogsgaard Andersen (born 27 October 1991) is a Danish racing cyclist, who competed for the UCI Women's Team  during the 2019 women's road cycling season.

References

External links

1991 births
Living people
Danish female cyclists
Place of birth missing (living people)
21st-century Danish women